Osterau is a tributary river of the Bramau in Schleswig-Holstein, Germany.

See also
List of rivers of Schleswig-Holstein

Rivers of Schleswig-Holstein
Rivers of Germany